Test Match is a cricket-themed board game first published in 1955 by John Waddington Limited in the United Kingdom and John Sands Pty. Ltd. in Australia.

Russell Jackson notes that "you pulled on a couple of cardboard tabs to randomly generate a type of delivery before your batting opponent did the same on the other end of the board, but if you were a genuinely competitive player, the reliance on luck over skill would eventually start to grate."

The original game depends entirely by chance, and is similar in principle to pencil cricket.

A three-dimensional version was released by Crown and Andrews in the 1977. This involved rolling a ball-bearing down a plastic gully attached to a plastic bowler. According to Jackson, this is "the greatest cricket board game of all time."

References

External links

Board games introduced in 1955
Cricket culture
Sports board games